Zbigniew Gawlik (born 1 July 1956) is a former Polish handball player who competed in the 1980 Summer Olympics and at the 1982 World Men's Handball Championship..

In 1980 he was part of the Polish team which finished seventh in the Olympic tournament.

External links
Profile 

1956 births
Living people
Sportspeople from Kraków
Polish male handball players
Handball players at the 1980 Summer Olympics
Olympic handball players of Poland
Expatriate handball players
Polish expatriate sportspeople in Austria